Nauraj Singh Randhawa (born 27 January 1992) is a Malaysian athlete, specialising in the high jump.

Athletics career
He won the gold medal in the 2013 and 2015 Southeast Asian Games. In 2016, he jumped 2.29 m in Kallang, Singapore. In 2017, he beat the 2.30 mark in Singapore, improving his personal best. With this record he became the first track and field athlete to reach the Olympics without a wild card since the 2008 Beijing Olympics when Lee Hup Wei, Roslinda Samsu and Yuan Yufang qualified on merit.

External links

1992 births
Living people
People from Johor
Malaysian people of Indian descent
Malaysian people of Punjabi descent
Malaysian male high jumpers
Athletes (track and field) at the 2014 Commonwealth Games
Athletes (track and field) at the 2018 Commonwealth Games
Athletes (track and field) at the 2014 Asian Games
Athletes (track and field) at the 2018 Asian Games
Commonwealth Games competitors for Malaysia
Athletes (track and field) at the 2016 Summer Olympics
Olympic athletes of Malaysia
World Athletics Championships athletes for Malaysia
Southeast Asian Games medalists in athletics
Southeast Asian Games gold medalists for Malaysia
Competitors at the 2013 Southeast Asian Games
Competitors at the 2015 Southeast Asian Games
Competitors at the 2017 Southeast Asian Games
Competitors at the 2019 Southeast Asian Games
Asian Games competitors for Malaysia
Southeast Asian Games silver medalists for Malaysia
Islamic Solidarity Games competitors for Malaysia
Athletes (track and field) at the 2022 Commonwealth Games